Mary Susan Lindee (born April 7, 1953) is an American historian and sociologist of science. She has been the Janice and Julian Bers Professor of History and Sociology of Science at the University of Pennsylvania since 2013. At the University of Pennsylvania, she previously served as Chair of History and Sociology of Science, and as Associate Dean for the Social Sciences. She was awarded a Guggenheim Fellowship in 2004.

Publications
Most widely held works by M. Susan Lindee:
 Suffering made real : American science and the survivors at Hiroshima, 1994
 Moments of truth in genetic medicine, 2005

References

External links
Faculty profile

1953 births
Living people
American women social scientists
American sociologists
American women sociologists
Sociologists of science
Medical sociologists
University of Texas at Austin alumni
Cornell University alumni
University of Pennsylvania faculty
American women historians
American historians of science
21st-century American historians
20th-century American historians
20th-century American women
21st-century American women